Berrington is a civil parish in Shropshire, England.  It contains 43 listed buildings that are recorded in the National Heritage List for England.  Of these, one is listed at Grade I, the highest of the three grades, two are at Grade II*, the middle grade, and the others are at Grade II, the lowest grade.  The parish contains the villages of Berrington, Betton Strange, Cross Houses, and is otherwise rural.  Most of the listed buildings are houses and associated structures, farmhouses and farm buildings, many of them dating from the 17th century or before, and basically timber framed.   There are two listed churches, the older church All Saints Church, Berrington also having listed structures in the churchyard.  In addition, the listed buildings include two bridges, a former hospital, a milestone and a milepost, a number of pumps, some with associated troughs, and a war memorial.


Key

Buildings

References

Citations

Sources

Lists of buildings and structures in Shropshire